Lizières is a commune in the Creuse department in the Nouvelle-Aquitaine region in central France.

Geography
The river Gartempe forms much of the southern boundary of the commune's territory.

Population

Sights
 The church, dating from the fifteenth century.

See also
Communes of the Creuse department

References

Communes of Creuse